Glenda Joy Anthony is a New Zealand mathematics teaching academic. She is currently a full professor at the Massey University.

Academic career

After a PhD  'Learning strategies in mathematics education'  at Massey University, Anthony joined the staff at Massey and rose to be full professor in 2010.

Anthony's research focuses on finding new ways to teach mathematics, including moving away from ability groups and peer teaching.

In 2013, Anthony was the first New Zealand recipient of the MERGA career research medal.

Selected works 
 Walshaw, Margaret, and Glenda Anthony. "The teacher’s role in classroom discourse: A review of recent research into mathematics classrooms." Review of educational research 78, no. 3 (2008): 516–551.
 Anthony, G., and M. Walshaw. "Effective pedagogy in Pāngarau/Mathematics: Best evidence synthesis iteration (BES)." (2007).
 Anthony, Glenda, and Margaret Walshaw. "Characteristics of effective teaching of mathematics: A view from the West." Journal of Mathematics Education 2, no. 2 (2009): 147–164.
 Anthony, Glenda. "Active learning in a constructivist framework." Educational studies in mathematics 31, no. 4 (1996): 349–369.
 Anthony, Glenda. "Factors influencing first-year students' success in mathematics." International Journal of Mathematical Education in Science and Technology 31, no. 1 (2000): 3–14.

References

External links
 
 
 institutional homepage

Living people
Year of birth missing (living people)
Academic staff of the Massey University
New Zealand women academics
New Zealand women writers